Kamila Valeryevna Valieva (born 26 April 2006) is a Russian figure skater. She is the 2022 European champion, 2021 Rostelecom Cup champion, 2021 Skate Canada International champion, and 2021 and 2023 Russian National silver medalist. She is also a provisional 2022 Olympic champion in the team event pending the conclusion of a WADA investigation. During the 2022 Winter Olympics, a sample that Valieva had submitted for a drug test in December tested positive for trimetazidine. As of mid-February, investigations were ongoing.

Valieva is the current world record holder for the women's short program, free skating, and total scores. She has set nine world records during her career. She is the first female skater to break the 250-, 260- and 270-point thresholds in the total score (all within one season), the first to break the 170- and 180-point thresholds in the free skate, and the first to break the 90-point threshold in the short program. She is the second woman to land the quadruple toe loop after training partner and teammate Alexandra Trusova, the fourth woman to land a quadruple jump of any kind, the 16th woman to land a triple Axel, and the third woman to land a triple Axel and quadruple jump in the same program after Alysa Liu and training partner and teammate Sofia Akateva. Valieva is also the first female skater to land a quadruple jump in Olympic competition.

Personal life 
Valieva was born on 26 April 2006 in Kazan, Republic of Tatarstan, Russia. She is of Volga Tatar ethnicity. She has one pet dog, a Pomeranian named Lëva (Lyova), gifted to her in 2019 by fans. Valieva was enrolled in gymnastics, ballet, and figure skating classes at an early age by her mother but was encouraged to focus solely on skating after turning five. She named Nathan Chen as one of the skaters whose technique and ability she admires. Along with her teammate Alexandra Trusova, she prefers to use white Edea skating boots with silver blades in competition.

Career

Early career 
Valieva began skating in 2009 in RSDUSSHOR in Kazan. Ksenia Ivanova first coached her, followed by Marina Kudriavtseva and Igor Lyutikov, and Natalia Dubinskaya. When she turned six, her parents moved her to Moscow to train at SSHOR Moskvich. In the spring of 2018, Valieva switched skating clubs to Sambo-70, where Eteri Tutberidze decided to allow Valieva to join her group.

In the 2018–19 season, before her international debut, recordings of Valieva's short program, set to Spiegel im Spiegel by Arvo Pärt and inspired by Pablo Picasso's painting Girl on a Ball, received worldwide attention. Tutberidze described it as her favorite program of the year. The program also drew the notice of Picasso's granddaughter Diana Widmaier Picasso, who invited Valieva to visit her in Paris. Among other victories that season, she won the Russian Younger Age Championships ahead of training mates Sofia Akatieva and Sofia Samodelkina. It was later announced that Valieva would keep her short program for her international debut in the upcoming season.

2019–2020 season: Junior World champion 

Valieva's international debut came in late August 2019 at a Junior Grand Prix competition in Courchevel, France. Ranked third in the short program and first in the free skate, she won the gold medal ahead of Wi Seo-yeong of South Korea and teammate and training partner Maiia Khromykh. At the competition, Valieva became the second female skater ever to land a quadruple toe loop in competition. Her total score at the event was the fourth highest score achieved by a ladies' single skater at the junior level, behind teammates Alexandra Trusova, Anna Shcherbakova, and Alena Kostornaia. Valieva also became the fourth junior lady to score above 200 points under the current GOE (Grade of Execution) system.

One month later, at the 2020 JGP Russia, she placed first in both programs with personal best scores to take the title ahead of compatriots Ksenia Sinitsyna and Viktoria Vasilieva. She attempted two quadruple toe loops in the free skate for the first time, landing one. With two gold medals, she qualified in first place to the 2019–20 Junior Grand Prix Final in Turin, Italy.

Before the 2019–20 Junior Grand Prix Final in December, a minor injury prevented Valieva from training the quadruple toe loop jump. She entered the final as a co-favorite for the title along with Alysa Liu of the United States. After placing fourth in the short program, Valieva delivered a clean free skate to take the title ahead of Liu, who dropped from first place in the short program after under-rotating a triple Axel and both of her quad Lutzes, and training mate Daria Usacheva.

At 13 years old, Valieva was too young to enter the 2020 Russian Championships as a senior in December. In early February, Valieva instead competed at the 2020 Russian Junior Championships, which she won after placing first in both programs ahead of Akatieva and Usacheva. She once again included two quadruple toe loop jumps in her free skate, after recovering from her previous injury, stepping out on one and landing another in combination with a double toe loop. After the competition, she was named to the Russian team for the 2020 World Junior Championships along with teammates Usacheva, who placed third, and Khromykh, who placed fifth; silver medalist Akatieva and fourth-place finisher Sofia Samodelkina were too young to be eligible.

The 2020 World Junior Championships were again seen by many as a showdown between Valieva and Liu, who had recently defended her title at the senior-level 2020 U.S. Championships. Valieva placed first in the short program ahead of Lee Hae-in of South Korea and Usacheva, setting a new personal best. Her score of 74.92 points was the second-highest short program score ever for a junior lady, only behind Kostornaia's short program at the 2018–19 Junior Grand Prix Final. In the free skate, she performed similarly to the Russian Junior Championships, stepping out on her opening quadruple toe loop and landing all other jumps cleanly, including a second quadruple toe loop in combination. She won the title and became the new Junior World Champion, ahead of Usacheva and Liu. Valieva remarked afterward, "there was a little mistake on the toe loop, but basically, I am pleased with my performance."

2020–2021 season 

Valieva skated at the 2020 Russian test skates in Moscow, showcasing her new programs for the 2020–21 season. She executed a quad toe combination in her free skate. She competed at the second stage of the Russian Cup. There, she skated cleanly, placing first in the short program but third in the free skate due to several unexpected mistakes. She won the silver medal. She later competed at the fifth stage of the Russian Cup. There, she placed first in the short program, with one step out on a triple Axel attempt. In the free skate, she also placed first, completing two quadruple toe loops (one in combination) and with only one mistake on a triple Lutz. She placed first, winning the gold medal with one of the highest total scores in Russian domestic competition.

Making her senior Russian Championships debut, Valieva placed second in the short program despite falling on her triple Axel. She also placed second in the free skate with two clean quads landed, and, despite an underrotated triple flip, won the silver medal.

Following the national championships, Valieva participated in the 2021 Channel One Trophy, a televised team competition organized in lieu of the canceled European Championships. Selected to the Red Machine team by captain Alina Zagitova, Valieva won both the short program and free skates, helping her team win the trophy. At her final event of the season, Valieva participated in the senior Russian Cup Final, winning the short program by a wide margin. In the free skate, she attempted a quadruple Salchow in competition for the first time but fell and made additional errors on both quad toe loop attempts. As a result, she finished third in the segment; however, the strength of her short program score allowed her to win the overall event by 2.04 points over teammate Maiia Khromykh.

2021–2022 season: Beijing Olympics
Valieva made her international senior debut at the 2021 CS Finlandia Trophy. She placed third in the short program after falling on her triple Axel attempt. In her free skate, she landed three quad jumps, recording a world record score of 174.31 points, also setting a new world record for total points (249.24).

Making her senior Grand Prix debut at the 2021 Skate Canada International, Valieva won the short program with a new personal best score of 84.19, 2.95 points ahead of Elizaveta Tuktamysheva in second place. She skated a clean program in the free skate with three quads and only one minor mistake in her triple Axel. Once again, she set a new world record for the women's free skate (180.89) and a total score (265.08). Valieva's second assignment of the season was the 2021 Rostelecom Cup, held this year at Sochi's Iceberg Skating Palace, the host venue for skating events at the 2014 Winter Olympics, instead of in Moscow as usual. In the short program, she scored 87.42 points, breaking Alena Kostornaia's previous world record of 85.45. She went on to raise the world records in the free skate (185.29) and total score (272.71).
Valieva's results qualified her to the Grand Prix Final, which was subsequently canceled due to travel and gathering restrictions prompted by the spread of the Omicron variant of SARS-CoV-2 during the COVID-19 pandemic.

On 24 December, Valieva placed first in the short program at the 2022 Russian Championships, nearly 10 points ahead of Shcherbakova in second place. She scored 193.10 for her free skate, with a gold medal-winning score of 283.48 points, nearly 35 points ahead of silver medalist Alexandra Trusova. She remarked afterward, "I did almost my maximum." As national champion, she was guaranteed a berth on the Russian Olympic team. Valieva made her European Championships debut in January 2022 in Tallinn, Estonia. She finished first in the short program with a clean skate and extended her world record score by over three points to become the first woman to break the 90-point barrier. In the free skate, Valieva fell on her triple Axel attempt for the second time in competition this season but skated the rest of her program cleanly to narrowly win the segment over teammates Shcherbakova and Trusova and take the European title. On 20 January, she was officially named to the Russian Olympic team.

Selected as the Russian entry in the women's segments of the Olympic team event, Valieva began the 2022 Winter Olympics with a first-place finish in the short program with a clean triple Axel, scoring near her own world record. Valieva placed four ordinals above American skater Karen Chen, moving the Russian team into first place in the competition at the end of the short program segments. She was chosen for the women's free skate in the team event as well, winning the segment with a program that included two clean quadruple jumps (Salchow and toe loop) and a triple Axel, albeit with a fall on a second quadruple toe loop attempt. Her score was over 30 points clear of second-place finisher Kaori Sakamoto of Japan. Valieva became the first woman to land a quadruple jump at the Olympic Games. The ROC team won the team event, but the medal ceremony was postponed pending an official investigation of filed allegations concerning possible doping, though Valieva was permitted to compete while the investigation is still in progress.

During the short program in the women's singles event at the Winter Olympics on 15 February, Valieva placed first ahead of Russian compatriot Shcherbakova despite faltering during a triple Axel though not falling. During the free skate on 17 February, she stumbled or fell at least four times as she skated to Boléro. She wept as she left the ice and did not earn a place in the top three, finishing in fourth place behind her compatriots Shcherbakova and Trusova, who came first and second, and bronze medalist Sakamoto. All three ROC skaters landed quads in their routines, the only women at the Olympics to do so. In early March 2022, the IOC and ISU banned all figure skaters and officials from Russia and Belarus from attending the World Championships due to Russia's 2022 invasion of Ukraine therefore not allowing Valieva to participate in the competition in France at the end of March.

On 25–27 March, Valieva participated in 2022 Channel One Trophy, a Russian domestic competition. During the short program, she did not perform any triple axle as she always did; instead, she cleanly jumped a double axle and scored 83.63 into first place. During free skating, Valieva cleanly jumped a quadruple toe-loop and scored 173.88 in the second place behind Anna Shcherbakova.

2022–2023 season 
Russian and Belarussian athletes remained banned from international events for the 2022–23 figure skating season, so the Russian Figure Skating Federation hosted its own domestic Grand Prix series. Valieva was scheduled for the first Grand Prix event, the Golden Skate of Moscow. In the free skate, she fell on a quadruple toe loop, but she still won the gold medal ahead of Sofia Akateva and Anastasiya Zinina. She then competed at the Grand Prix stage in her hometown, Kazan, and won another gold medal. She then competed at the Russian Championships held in Krasnoyarsk. In the short program, she popped her triple axel and only performed a single axel, causing her to finish in fourth place. She won the free skate with a score of 170.71, but still finished second overall behind Sofia Akateva.

On 13 January 2023, the Russian Anti-Doping Agency (RUSADA) stripped Valieva of her gold medal in senior women's singles of the 2022 Russian Figure Skating Championships stemming from her positive test for trimetazidine, a banned substance, on the second day of the Women's competition. The organization said that "Valieva had no fault in the positive drug test". However, RUSADA refused to strip her Olympic gold medal in the team event, prompting WADA to file a case to the Court of Arbitration for Sport. It was suspected that RUSADA decision was a 'half-measure' intended to preserve Russia's Olympic gold medal. Subsequently, Alexandra Trusova became the gold medalist of the 2022 Russian Championships, with Anna Shcherbakova moving up to silver and Adeliia Petrosian receiving the bronze medal.

Official probe into allegations of doping and misconduct
Ostensibly, a matter of allegations concerning misconduct by Valieva began on 25 December 2021, when Valieva submitted a routine urine sample for analysis following her win at the Russian Nationals on 24 December. The normal 20-day testing time for the sample lapsed, apparently due to COVID-19 related backlogs at the testing laboratory; however, the positive doping test results were eventually forwarded for evaluation in February 2022, after the Beijing Olympics had started, and the team event had concluded. On 14 November 2022, the Court of Arbitration for Sport (CAS) registered an appeal by the World Anti-Doping Agency (WADA) about a possible violation of anti-doping rules by Russian figure skater Kamila Valieva.

During Beijing Olympics
The medal ceremony for the team event, in which the ROC won gold, was originally scheduled for 8 February but was delayed over what International Olympic Committee (IOC) spokesperson Mark Adams described as a situation that required "legal consultation" with the International Skating Union (ISU). Several media outlets reported on 9 February that the issue was a positive test by Valieva for the banned substance trimetazidine, which was officially confirmed on 11 February. The sample in question was taken by the Russian Anti-Doping Agency (RUSADA) at the 2022 Russian Figure Skating Championships on 25 December 2021. On 8 February 2022, the urine sample tested positive for traces of trimetazidine. The sample was analyzed at the Doping Control Laboratory at Stockholm's Karolinska University Hospital, a World Anti-Doping Agency (WADA)-accredited lab. The test result came one day after the team event concluded.

Valieva was given a provisional suspension after her positive result, but was cleared on appeal by RUSADA's independent Disciplinary Anti-Doping Committee (DAC) on 9 February, just a day later. Due to Valieva being a minor at the time and thus classified as a "protected person" under WADA guidelines, RUSADA and the IOC announced on 12 February that they would broaden the scope of their respective investigations to include members of her entourage, such as coaches and team doctors. Following formal appeals lodged by the IOC, the ISU, and WADA to review RUSADA DAC's decision, the Court of Arbitration for Sport (CAS) heard the case on 13 February, ahead of her scheduled appearance in the women's singles event beginning 15 February. On 13 February, Valieva's mother testified at the CAS hearing that Valieva took hypoxen for heart "variations". According to an IOC representative, Valieva herself argued at the hearing that the positive test result was "due to contamination with [her] grandad's medicine".
On 14 February, the CAS declined to reinstate Valieva's provisional suspension and ruled that she would be allowed to compete in the women's singles event. The CAS decided that preventing her from competing "would cause her irreparable harm in the circumstances" while noting that any medals won by Valieva at the Beijing Olympics would be withheld pending the results of the continuing investigation into her doping violation. The accommodating decision from the court, subject to further and ongoing investigation, was made on three grounds: due to her age, she was a "protected person" per WADA code, subject to different rules than adult athletes; she "did not test positive during the Olympic Games in Beijing"; and "There were serious issues of untimely notification of the results ... which impinged upon the Athlete's ability to establish certain legal requirements for her benefit". The IOC announced that the medal ceremony for the team event would not take place until the investigation concluded as there is a concrete decision whether to strip Valieva and the ROC of their medals.

On 15 February, after placing first in the women's short program, Valieva was reported by The New York Times to have also tested positive for two other drugs that are not banned from competition, hypoxen and L-carnitine, from her 25 December urine sample. The combination of these drugs with trimetazidine was described as a "trifecta of substances" which "seem to be aimed at increasing endurance, reducing fatigue and promoting greater efficiency in using oxygen" by Travis Tygart, chief executive of the United States Anti-Doping Agency (USADA). At the time of the doping test, Valieva had declared taking hypoxen and L-carnitine, both of which are used in Russia supposedly to treat heart conditions or enhance athletic performance. According to The New York Times, neither agent is backed by scientific evidence of efficacy in improving cardiovascular function in athletes. To allow for the possibility that Valieva's results may be disqualified following investigation, the IOC asked the ISU to expand the qualifying field for the women's singles free skating by one to 25, contingent upon Valieva being one of the top 24 skaters after the short program.

In a press conference, the day after the free skate, IOC president Thomas Bach said he was "very, very disturbed" by the "chilling atmosphere" surrounding Valieva during the free skate as coach Eteri Tutberidze berated her following a mistake-filled performance that dropped her off the podium.<ref name=Eurosport-18Feb22-Chilling>{{cite news |url=https://www.eurosport.com/figure-skating/beijing-2022/2022/kamila-valieva-treatment-by-entourage-was-chilling-says-ioc-president-thomas-bach-at-winter-olympics_sto8802526/story.shtml |title=Kamila Valieva treatment by entourage was 'chilling says IOC president Thomas Bach at Winter Olympics 2022 |work=Eurosport |date=18 February 2022}}</ref> Bach also insinuated that her coaches likely played a role in her positive test. President Vladimir Putin's spokesperson Dmitry Peskov called Bach's comments "deeply inappropriate", stating that "the harshness of a coach in high-level sport is key for their athletes to achieve victories."

IOC President Bach later added, "Doping is very rarely done alone with the athletes" and that the "ones who have administered this drug in her body, these are the ones who are guilty." WADA also filed an interim brief indicating that Valieva's acknowledgment of taking the two permitted substances, Hypoxen and L-carnitine, could be read as undercutting her testimony that the banned substance, trimetazidine, was ingested by error. When the US team and the Japanese team announced their choices of athletes to compete at the March ISU World Championships in France, the Figure Skating Federation of Russia had not yet indicated their choice of which three women to send to France  which, at the time, Valieva remained eligible to compete  unless a negative outcome for doping was filed against her before the competition began. However, Valieva's eligibility has since been rescinded by the ISU, although for an unrelated reason, as all Russian and Belarusian skaters were banned due to the ongoing Russian invasion of Ukraine.

After Beijing Olympics
By 9 March 2022, Travis Tygart of the USADA reported that Valieva had not requested that her "B" sample be tested, apparently accepting the results of initial testing and relying on her explanation that the banned substance TMZ belonged to her grandfather and only accidentally contaminated or became mixed into her own use of allowed nutrients and supplements. Tygart further stated that as a minor, Valieva could still be either fully exculpated or given a warning concerning her testing positive, depending on the extent of findings in the ongoing RUSADA investigation of doping. According to Tygart, an adverse finding against her as a first offense could still be assessed as a two-year suspension, which is half of the suspension time which could be assessed for adults. On 17 March, WADA requested that RUSADA complete its report on Valieva and her entourage by 8 August 2022. On 7 June 2022, ISU regulation governing the minimum age for competition at figure skating events was raised from 15 to 17 years of age following the Valieva incident at the Beijing Olympics.

On 8 August, insidethegames wrote that the six-month report originally expected on 8 August would be allowed some extra time because further data was requested by RUSADA in July in order to complete its report stating that: "WADA President Witold Bańka recently told insidethegames that he expects a hearing will be held by RUSADA 'quite soon', and that the organization will 'monitor it'." On 15 September, Christine Brennan writing for USA Today indicated that RUSADA had completed their report and delivered it for evaluation and subsequent scheduling of official hearings concerning the investigation of Valieva's possible misconduct regarding the use of banned substances during competition. Brennan further quoted U.S. Anti-Doping CEO Travis Tygart stating that: “Given it appears that RUSADA's investigation is over and the case is now headed to court, they must have found sufficient evidence of a violation or otherwise the case would be closed, and WADA would be notified of its right to appeal." A disciplinary hearing reviewing the Rusada investigation results is presently planned to take place in late September or early October. A decision by RUSADA was issued in mid-October, which was endorsed by WADA, stated that the details of the Valieva hearing and its scheduled dates would be placed under international guidelines for the protection of minors (Valieva was 15 years old when the positive test results were disclosed) and not to be disclosed publicly. Travis Tygart, the CEO of the U.S. Anti-Doping Agency stated, “If she is exonerated, there is nothing to hide and it should be made public... Certainly, keeping the decision and facts secret make a mockery of the whole process, and there is no wonder athletes and the public do not trust the global WADA anti-doping system... Short of this... it’s impossible for athletes or the public to believe what happened at the 2022 Beijing Games was real and not just another fraudulent win by the Russians like so many before, as the evidence has clearly shown.” 

Evan Bates and Nathan Chen criticized the lack of transparency in the review of the Valieva case as creating an undue delay for the presentation of the Olympic medals, which were withheld for more than a year, as of March 2023, from being awarded until the results of the Valieva case are fully resolved to determine if Russia ought to keep the gold medal or be stripped of it. Although Russia as a country is currently banned from participating in international skating events due to the 2022 Russian invasion of Ukraine, Valieva has continued to compete within Russian borders without being hindered by RUSADA as recently as the Russian Grand Prix held in October 2022. In mid-November, WADA requested that CAS take up the review of the Valieva case with an eye towards a 4-year suspension of Valieva, which would exclude her from competition at the next Winter Olympics, and to rescind her first place performance at the previous Beijing Olympics because "the Russian Anti-Doping Agency (RUSADA) did not meet a WADA-imposed Nov. 4 deadline to deliver a verdict on Valieva's case." 

On 13 January, Valieva was denied her gold medal in Senior Women's singles of the 2022 Russian Figure Skating Championships following a ruling by RUSADA stating that her positive drug test was coincident with the December 2021 competition, while her win for team Russia at the Beijing Olympics in February 2022 was endorsed as valid following her passing drug tests in Beijing; WADA has stated that it will continue to press its request for CAS to review RUSADA's decision concerning the positive drug test. By the end of February 2023, CNN reported that WADA had filed an appeal to reverse the preliminary decision concerning Valieva's case as inadequately determined and to re-open the question of suspension of Valieva from international competition for the full four year period according to established by-laws.

 Significant technical achievements 
On 23 August 2019, at the junior level of the Grand Prix in France, Valieva performed a quadruple toe loop with a positive "GOE", which made her the second woman to perform this jump in the history of figure skating (after Alexandra Trusova) at competitions under the auspices of the International Skating Union. On 18 October 2020, a video appeared on the Internet where she performed a triple Axel with complication in training with two hands up. On 5 December 2020, she cleanly performed the triple Axel in the short program at the stage of the Russian Cup in Moscow. On 12 February 2021, a video appeared on the Internet where Valieva performed a quadruple Salchow in training with two hands up. In 2022, Valieva became the first woman to land a quadruple jump at the Olympic Games.

 Awards 
In February 2022, after the end of the Olympics, Valieva received the Order of Friendship from President Vladimir Putin.

On 18 March 2022 in Kazan, Tatarstan President Rustam Minnikhanov met and awarded her a “Duslyk” order and a medal of “100 years of the Establishment of Tatar ASSR” to her mother, Alsu Valieva.

 Programs 

 World records and achievements 

 Became only the second woman to land a quad toe loop at the 2019 JGP France.
 Became the first woman ever to surpass 90 in the short program, 170 and 180 point barrier in the free skate as well as 250, 260 and 270 point barrier in total.
Set the junior record for the highest free skate score and total score at the 2020 Junior World Championships, surpassing the previous records in both categories set by her former training mate Alexandra Trusova. Her record scores were later surpassed by teammate Sofia Akateva in 2021.
 Set the new senior record for the highest valued triple Axel with 11.54 points at the 2022 European Championships
 Became the first European woman to land a triple Axel and the first woman to land a quadruple jump at the Olympic Games during the team event, held from 4–7 February 2022.

 Senior world record scores 
Valieva has set eight world record scores.

 Junior world record scores 

Valieva has set two junior world record scores under the +5 / -5 GOE (Grade of Execution) system.

 Competitive highlights GP: Grand Prix; JGP: Junior Grand Prix Detailed results 

Senior level

Small medals for short and free programs awarded only at ISU Championships. Personal bests are italicized. Current world record scores are bold and italicized''. Previous world records highlighted in bold.

Junior level 

Small medals for short and free programs awarded only at ISU Championships. Previous junior world record scores highlighted in bold.

References

External links 
 

! colspan="3" style="border-top: 5px solid #78FF78;" |World Record Holders

! colspan="3" style="border-top: 5px solid #78FF78;" |World Junior Record Holders

2006 births
Living people
Tatar sportspeople
Russian female single skaters
Russian sportspeople in doping cases
Sportspeople from Kazan
Figure skaters at the 2022 Winter Olympics
Olympic figure skaters of Russia
Medalists at the 2022 Winter Olympics
Olympic medalists in figure skating
Olympic gold medalists for the Russian Olympic Committee athletes
Volga Tatar people
World Junior Figure Skating Championships medalists
Sports controversies
Olympic Games controversies
21st-century Russian women